William Boyd Carpenter  (26 March 1841, Liverpool – 26 October 1918, Westminster) was a Church of England cleric who became Bishop of Ripon and Royal Chaplain to Queen Victoria.

Background
William Boyd Carpenter was the second son of Henry Carpenter, perpetual curate of St Michael's Church, Aigburth, Liverpool, who married (marriage licence 1837 in Derry) Hester Boyd, of Derry, sister of Archibald Boyd, Dean of Exeter.

Carpenter was the uncle of Mrs Henry Williams of Moor Park House, Beckwithshaw, North Yorkshire. In 1897 he consecrated St Michaels and All Angels Church at Beckwithshaw, after she and her husband had funded its construction.

He was an advocate for the poor and against the caste system in India, stating during a religious lecture at the University of Oxford that "we must show fierce scorn against the hateful laws of caste and proclaim the natural equality of all men".

Education and career

Educated at the Liverpool Institute, before going up to St Catharine's College, Cambridge, Boyd Carpenter was appointed Hulsean Lecturer at Cambridge in 1878. He held several curacies, was Vicar of Christ Church, Lancaster Gate, from 1879 to 1884, Canon of Windsor in 1882–84, and after 1884 Bishop of Ripon. In 1887 he was appointed Bampton Lecturer at Oxford, and in 1895 Pastoral Lecturer on Theology at Cambridge. In June 1901, he received an honorary doctorate of Divinity from the University of Glasgow. During his time in Ripon, he moved from his original evangelical leanings to a broad church outlook.

In 1904 and 1913 he visited the United States and delivered the Noble lectures at Harvard. He was Chaplain-in-Ordinary to Queen Victoria, Edward VII, and George V. He resigned his see in 1911 on the grounds of ill-health and became a Canon and Sub-Dean of Westminster.

Boyd Carpenter served as Clerk of the Closet from 1903 to 1918.

Publications
His publications include:
 Commentary on Revelation (1879)
 Permanent Elements of Religion (Bampton lectures, 1889)
 Popular History of the Church of England (1900)
 Witness to the Influence of Christ (1905)
 Some Pages of my Life (1911)
 Life's Tangled Thread (1912)
 The Apology of Experience (1913)
 The Burning Bush and Other Sermons.   (1893)

Family
In 1864 Carpenter married his first wife, Harriet Charlotte, daughter of the Rev. J. W. Peers, of Chislehampton. They had four sons and four daughters, including:
 Henry John Boyd-Carpenter (1865–1923),  colonial official in Egypt, where he was Chief Inspector to the Ministry of Public Instruction, then Inspector General of Schools; who married in Epperstone on 16 December 1902 Ethel Ley, daughter of Sir Francis Ley, 1st Baronet, of Epperstone Manor, Nottinghamshire.
 William Boyd-Carpenter (1869–1954).
 Annie Boyd-Carpenter (1870-1927) married Francis Wentworth-Sheilds, Bishop of Armidale.
 Sir Archibald Boyd Boyd-Carpenter (1873–1937), Conservative MP, father of John Archibald Boyd-Carpenter, Baron Boyd-Carpenter (1908–1998), also a Conservative MP.

Harriet died in 1887 and in 1883 Carpenter married secondly, Annie Maude, daughter of publisher W. W. Gardner, with whom he had a son and three daughters.

The composer Stephen Oliver (1950–1992), through his mother (Charlotte) Hester Girdlestone born 1911, granddaughter of Carpenter), and his nephew, the comedian John Oliver (b. 1977), are descendants.

References

Sources

External links

 Bibliographic directory of William Boyd Carpenter from Project Canterbury
 
 
 "Bishop Boyd Carpenter: Sheep or Shepherd in the Eugenics Movement?" by David Morris, Galton Institute Newsletter Issue 55 (June 2005)

1841 births
1918 deaths
19th-century English Anglican priests
Alumni of St Catharine's College, Cambridge
Bishops of Ripon (modern diocese)
William
Canons of Westminster
Canons of Windsor
Clerks of the Closet
English religious writers
Honorary Chaplains to the Queen
Knights Commander of the Royal Victorian Order
Parapsychologists
20th-century Church of England bishops
21st-century Church of England bishops